Heinrich August Wrisberg (20 June 1739 – 29 March 1808) was an anatomist. He also published under the Latinized version of his name as Henricus Augustus Wrisberg.

Education
He obtained his MD in 1763 at the University of Göttingen with a thesis entitled: De Respiratione Prima Nervo Phrenico Et Calore Animali: Pavca Disserit Et Simvl Vicarias Anatomiam Profitendi Operas Ad Diem XXIV. Octobris Aperiendas Indicit.

Career

He was a professor of medicine and obstetrics. Wrisberg studied the sympathetic nervous system and described the Wrisberg ganglion of the cardiac plexus. He also wrote a text on hernias.

The cuneiform cartilages are sometimes called the "Wrisberg cartilages".

There are two nerves known as the nerve of Wrisberg.

References

External links
 

1739 births
1808 deaths
People from Goslar (district)
German anatomists
18th-century German scientists
19th-century German scientists